The Ambassador from Israel to Costa Rica is Israel's foremost diplomatic representative in Costa Rica.

List of Ambassadors

Amir Ofek (2017-)
Haddad Avraham (2013 - 2017)
Daniel Saban (2010 - 2013)
Ehud Eitam 2006 - 2010
Alexander Ben-Zvi 2002 - 2006
Daniel Gal 1999 - 2002
Yaakov Brakha 1997 - 1999
Shlomo Tal 1994 - 1997 
Nehamia Tevel 1989 - 1993
David Tourgeman 1982 - 1986
Hagai Dikan 1979 - 1982
Chanan Olami 1976 - 1979
Jeonathan Prato 1969 - 1972
Walter Abeles 1966 - 1969
Joshua Nissim Shai (Non-Resident, Guatemala City) 1959 - 1964
David Shaltiel (Non-Resident, Mexico City) 1956 - 1959
Minister Yossef Keisari (Non-Resident, Mexico City) 1954 - 1956

References 

Costa Rica
Israel